is a Japanese actress.

Biography
Her skill is dancing, having won the Tokyo preliminaries of the All Japan Dance Contest as well as the kids division of Sanrio Dance Contest in 2003. Ito has an older brother and an older sister. She graduated from Chiba Prefectural Wakamatsu High School.

Ito debuted in the drama 14-kagetsu: Tsuma ga Kodomo ni Kaette Iku in 2003. While only nine years old and without any acting experience, she attracted attention for playing an adult turned into a child. Ito continued acting in Minna Mukashi wa Kodomodatta and The Queen's Classroom.

Ito is often cast with The Queen's Classroom co-star Mayuko Fukuda in dramas such as Enka no Joō, Chibi Maruko-chan, and Kiri no Hi.

Filmography

TV series

Films

Japanese dub
Live-action

Animation

Awards

References

External links
 Official profile 

Japanese child actresses
Living people
21st-century Japanese actresses
Year of birth missing (living people)
Asadora lead actors